Quesnelia seideliana is a species of flowering plant in the family Bromeliaceae, endemic to Brazil. It was first described in 1963. It is found in the Atlantic Forest ecoregion within Rio de Janeiro state, in southeastern Brazil.

Gallery

See also

References

seideliana
Endemic flora of Brazil
Flora of the Atlantic Forest
Flora of Rio de Janeiro (state)
Plants described in 1963